Megacorma iorioi is a moth of the  family Sphingidae. It is known from Seram in Indonesia.

References

Acherontiini
Moths described in 2003